The Chiaming Lake (Bunun：Cidanuman Buan (mirror of the moon)) is a lake in Haiduan Township, Taitung County, Taiwan. It is the second highest lake area in Taiwan.

Name
In Bunun language, Chiaming Lake is called "cidanuman buan", meaning "Mirror of the moon"; in Taiwan, it is traditionally referred as "Angel's teardrop" or, due to its deep blue color, "God's lost sapphire".

History
The lake was formed by glacial movement during the ice age. The forest authority closed the mountain area for maintenance and restoration works on 10 December 2014 until 31 March 2015. On 5 January 2018, the lake was closed for visitors and will be opened again on 1 April 2018 to allow the natural vegetation restoration of the area around the lake.

Geography
This oval-shaped lake is located along the Southern Cross-Island Highway. The lake surface is 120 meters long and 80 meters wide at an elevation of 3,310 meters. It is surrounded by emerald green forest plantation and wildlife. The area surrounds the lake has lodges and hiking trail with a length of 13 km.

See also
 Geography of Taiwan
 List of lakes of Taiwan
 List of tourist attractions in Taiwan

References

Lakes of Taitung County